is a 1997 Japanese animated psychological thriller film directed by Satoshi Kon. It is based on the novel  by Yoshikazu Takeuchi, with a screenplay written by Sadayuki Murai. Featuring the voices of Junko Iwao, Rica Matsumoto, Shiho Niiyama, Masaaki Okura, Shinpachi Tsuji and Emiko Furukawa, the plot follows a member of a Japanese idol group who retires from music to pursue an acting career. As she becomes a victim of stalking, gruesome murders begin to occur, and she starts to lose her grip on reality.

The film deals with the blurring of the line between fantasy and reality, a commonly found theme in Kon's later works, such as Millennium Actress (2001) and Paprika (2006).

Plot 

Mima Kirigoe, member of a J-pop idol group named "CHAM!", decides to leave the group to become a full-time actress. She gets stalked by an obsessive fan named Me-Mania, who is upset by her change from a clean-cut image. Following directions from a fan letter, Mima discovers a website called "Mima's Room" containing public diary entries written from her perspective, and which has her daily life and thoughts recorded in great detail. During her acting career, she is joined by manager and former pop-idol Rumi Hidaka, and her agent, Tadokoro. Mima confides in Rumi about "Mima's Room", but is advised to ignore it.

Mima's first job is a minor role in a television detective drama called Double Bind, however, Tadokoro lobbies the producers of Double Bind, and succeeds in securing Mima a larger part that involves a rape scene. Despite Rumi's objections, Mima accepts the role, although this leaves her severely affected. On her way home, she sees her reflection dressed in her former idol outfit. The reflection claims she's "the real Mima". Between the ongoing stresses of filming Double Bind, her lingering regret over leaving CHAM!, her paranoia of being stalked, and her increasing obsession with "Mima's Room", Mima begins to suffer from psychosis: in particular, struggling to distinguish real life from her work in show business, and having repeated apparently unreal sightings of her former self, "the real Mima".

Several people who had been involved in her acting are murdered. Mima finds evidence which makes her appear to be the prime suspect, and her mental instability makes her doubt her own memories and innocence, as she recalls brutally murdering pornographer Murano. Mima manages to finish shooting Double Bind, the final scene of which reveals that her character killed and assumed the identity of her sister due to trauma-induced dissociative identity disorder. After the rest of the filming staff have left the studio, Me-Mania, acting on e-mailed instructions from "the real Mima" to "eliminate the impostor", attempts to rape and kill her, but Mima knocks him unconscious with a hammer.

Mima is found backstage by Rumi and taken back to Rumi's home, where she wakes up in a room modelled on Mima's own room, only to discover that Rumi was the culprit behind "Mima's Room", the serial murders, and the folie à deux that manipulated and scapegoated Me-Mania. Rumi previously developed a second personality who believed herself to be the "real Mima", using information from Mima's confiding in her as the basis for "Mima's Room". She also reveals her motives: she is displeased by Mima retiring from the idol industry and hence, seeks to destroy and replace her in order to 'redeem' her image. At wit's end, Rumi's "Mima" personality chases Mima through the city to murder her. Mima incapacitates Rumi with a mirror shard in self-defense. After freeing herself, Rumi hallucinates the lights of an oncoming truck as stage lights and steps out into the road to pose in front of the approaching vehicle, but Mima manages to save her from being run over at the last second. With that, Mima's hallucinations seem to be over.

Some time later, Mima is now a well-known actress and visits Rumi in a mental institution. Rumi's doctor says that she still believes she is a pop idol most of the time. Mima says she's learned a lot from her experience, thanks to Rumi. As Mima leaves the hospital, she overhears two nurses talking about her. They think she is a lookalike, as the real Mima Kirigoe would supposedly have no reason to visit a mental institution. As Mima enters her car, she smiles at herself in the rear-view mirror before declaring, "No, I'm real."

Cast 

The following actors in the English adaptation are listed in the credits without specification to their respective roles: James Lyon, Frank Buck, David Lucas, Elliot Reynolds, Kermit Beachwood, Sam Strong, Carol Stanzione, Ty Webb, Billy Regan, Dari Mackenzie, George C. Cole, Syd Fontana, Sven Nosgard, Bob Marx, Devon Michaels, Robert Wicks and Mattie Rando.

Production 

This film was Satoshi Kon's first directorial effort.
It all started when Masao Maruyama, a producer at Madhouse at the time, who had appreciated Kon's work on the OVA JoJo's Bizarre Adventure, contacted him to ask if he would be interested in directing in the fall of 1994.
The original author, Yoshikazu Takeuchi, allegedly first planned a live-action film based on his novel. However, due to funding difficulties, it was downgraded to direct-to-video and then direct-to-video animation.
When Kon received the initial offer, it was for an OVA project, so he made Perfect Blue as a video animation.
Then, it was decided to be released as a movie in a hurry just before its completion.
This work was originally made as a video animation for a narrow market, so it was expected to disappear as soon as a few people talked about it.
The fact that such a work was treated as a film, invited to many film festivals around the world, and released as a package in many countries was unexpected for those involved.
Psychological horror was not a mainstream genre in Japanese animation, and there was no precedent for it at the time, so it would normally have been rejected. So no one thought it would be a hit since it was just adopted by chance. That's why Kon was able to get the job.

By the time Kon was offered the job, the title Perfect Blue and the content, a story about a B-class idol and a perverted fan had already been set.
He hadn't read the original novel and only read the script for the film, which was said to be close to the original, and the script was never used in the actual film.
There is no play-within-a-play in the original story, nor is there a motif of blurring the boundary between dream and reality.
The first plot was a simple splatter/psycho-horror story about an idol girl that is attacked by a perverted fan who cannot tolerate her image change, and there were also many depictions of bleeding, so it was not suitable for Kon who does not like horror or idols.
Kon said that if he were free to make a plan, he would never have thought of such a setting.
This genre was overused, having already been dealt with in various works such as Seven, Basic Instinct, The Silence of the Lambs, etc., and was also something that anime was not good at.
Since most of the works in that genre pursue how perverted or crazy the perpetrators, the murderers, are, Kon focused on "how the inner world of the protagonist, the victim, is broken by being targeted by the stalker" in order to outsmart the audience.
On the other hand, the play within a play, Double Bind, is more like a parody than a straight psycho-horror, and he made it with the intention of criticizing Japanese TV dramas that are easily made by imitating Hollywood fads immediately.

Kon decided to take on the role of director because he couldn't resist the allure of directing for the first time, and because the original author allowed him to change the story as he liked as long as he kept three things in mind to make the film work: the main character is a B-grade idol, she has a rabid fan (stalker), and it is a horror film.
So he took some elements from the original work, such as the uniquely Japanese existence of idols, the "otaku" fans that surround them, and the stalkers that have become more radical, and came up with as many ideas as possible with the scriptwriter, Sadayuki Murai, with the intention of using them to create a completely new story.
And the film needed a core motif, which had to be found not by the screenwriter or anyone else, but by the director, Kon himself.
So he came up with the motif of two things that should have a "borderline," such as "dream and reality," "memory and fact," and "oneself and others," becoming borderless and blending together, based on the short film Magnetic Rose (from Memories), for which he had written a script, and the suspended manga "Opus.
In the meantime, he came up with the idea that "a character more like 'me' than 'I', the protagonist, to the people around 'me' " is created on the Internet without 'my' knowledge.
The character is "the past me" for the protagonist, and this "other me" that should have existed only on the Internet has materialized due to external factors (the consciousness of the fans who want the protagonist to be like that) and internal factors (the protagonist's regret that she might have been more comfortable in the past). And then the composition that the character and the protagonist herself confronted emerged.
It was only then that he became convinced that this work could be established as his own video work.
Kon decided to interpret the original story above as a story about an idol girl who broke down by a sudden change in her environment or by a stalker who targets her, and wrote a completely new script with Sadayuki Murai.
Initially, Murai wrote the first draft of the script, and Kon added or removed ideas from it. They spent a lot of time discussing, and many of the ideas came out of that.
Next, Kon wrote all the storyboards, where he also made changes to dialogue and other elements.
The drawing work was also carried out in parallel.

The company that purchased the videogram and television rights to Perfect Blue before the film was completed advised the distributor to submit the film to the Fantasia International Film Festival in Montreal, Canada, so that it could be released overseas first.
Since it was his first film, director Kon was still unknown. Therefore, the distributor introduced the film as the first directorial effort of a disciple of Katsuhiro Otomo, the creator of Akira, which had already become a hit overseas.
Otomo is credited as a planning collaborator, but he never arranged for the company to ask Kon to direct the film, nor was he involved in the film. However, it seems that Otomo once advised the original author about the circumstances of the animation industry when he was touting around the animation project here and there.
At Fantasia, the film was so well received that a second screening was hurriedly arranged for those who could not see it, and it was eventually voted by the audience as the best international film.
Thanks to that, the distributor began to receive invitations from more than 50 film festivals, including Germany, Sweden, Australia, and South Korea.
The distributor began negotiations with distributors in various European countries and eventually succeeded in selling the film in major markets such as Spanish, French, Italian, English and German-speaking countries prior to its release in Japan.
The distributor was successful in obtaining permission from filmmakers Roger Corman and Irvin Kershner to use their comments in recommending the film free of charge worldwide. As a result, their comments were used on international theater flyers and in worldwide promotions.

Later, there was a rumor that director Darren Aronofsky had purchased the remake rights for Perfect Blue. However, when he spoke with Kon in a magazine in 2001, he stated that he had to abandon the purchase of the rights due to various reasons.
He also said that it was a homage to the movie that his movie Requiem for a Dream had the same angles and shots as Perfect Blue.

A live action film adaptation of the novel, Perfect Blue: Yume Nara Samete, was later made and released in 2002. This version was directed by Toshiki Satō from a screenplay by Shinji Imaoka and Masahiro Kobayashi.

Release schedule 

Perfect Blue premiered on August 5, 1997, at the Fantasia Film Festival in Montreal, Canada, and had its general release in Japan on February 28, 1998.

The film was also released on UMD by Anchor Bay Entertainment on December 6, 2005. It featured the film in widescreen, leaving the film kept within black bars on the PSP's 16:9 screen. This release also contains no special features and only the English audio track. The film was released on Blu-ray and DVD in Region B by Anime Limited in 2013. In the U.S., Perfect Blue aired on the Encore cable television network and was featured by the Sci Fi Channel on December 10, 2007, as part of its Ani-Monday block. In Australia, Perfect Blue aired on the SBS Television Network on April 12, 2008, and previously sometime in mid 2007 in a similar timeslot.

The film had a theatrical re-release in the United States by GKIDS on September 6 and 10, 2018, with both English dubbed and subtitled screenings. GKIDS and Shout! Factory released the film on Blu-ray Disc in North America on March 26, 2019.

Analysis 

In an analysis of Perfect Blue and Kon's other works, professor Susan Napier states that "Perfect Blue announces its preoccupation with perception, identity, voyeurism, and performance – especially in relation to the female – right from its opening sequence. The perception of reality cannot be trusted, with the visual set up only to not be reality, especially as the psychodrama heights towards the climax." Napier also sees themes related to pop idols and their performances as impacting the gaze and the issue of their roles. Mima's madness results from her own subjectivity and attacks on her identity. The ties to Alfred Hitchcock's work are broken with the murder of her male controllers. Otaku describes the film as a "critique of the consumer society of contemporary Japan."

Reception and legacy 

The film was well received critically in the festival circuit, winning awards at the 1997 Fantasia Festival in Montréal, and Fantasporto Film Festival in Portugal.

Critical response in the United States upon its theatrical release was also positive. , the film had an 83% approval rating on Rotten Tomatoes based on 52 reviews, with an average score of 7.3/10. The consensus stated, "Perfect Blue is overstylized, but its core mystery is always compelling, as are the visual theatrics." On Metacritic, the film has a score of 67 based on 17 reviews, indicating "generally favorable reviews." Time included the film on its Top 5 Anime film list, Total Film ranked Perfect Blue twenty-fifth on their list of greatest animated films, and /Film named it the scariest animated film ever. It also made the list for Entertainment Weeklys best movies never seen from 1991 to 2011. In 2022, IndieWire named Perfect Blue the twelfth best movie of the 1990s.

Dennis Harvey of Variety wrote that while the film "ultimately disappoints with its just-middling tension and underdeveloped scenario, it still holds attention by trying something different for the genre". Hoai-Tran Bui of /Film called Perfect Blue "deeply violent, both physically and emotionally", writing that "this is a film that will leave you with profound psychological scars, and the feeling that you want to take a long, long shower". Bob Graham of the San Francisco Chronicle noted the film's ability to "take the thriller, media fascination, psychological insight and pop culture and stand them all on their heads" via its "knowing, adult view of what seems to be a young-teenage paradise." Writing for Anime News Network, reviewer Tim Henderson described the film as "a dark, sophisticated psychological thriller" with its effect of "over-obsession funneled through early Internet culture" and produces a "reminder of how much celebrity fandom has evolved in only a decade". Reviewing the 2019 GKIDS Blu-Ray release, Neil Lumbard of Blu-Ray.com heralded Perfect Blue as "one of the greatest anime films of all time" and "a must-see masterpiece that helped to pave the way for more complex anime films to follow," while Chris Beveridge of The Fandom Post noted "this is not a film one can watch often overall, nor should you, but when you settle into it you put everything else away, turn down the lights, and savor an excellent piece of filmmaking."

Madonna incorporated clips from Perfect Blue into a remix of her song "What It Feels Like for a Girl" as a video interlude during her Drowned World Tour in 2001.

American filmmaker Darren Aronofsky acknowledged the similarities in his 2010 film Black Swan, but denied that Black Swan was inspired by Perfect Blue; his previous film Requiem for a Dream features a remake of a scene from Perfect Blue. A re-issued blog entry mentioned Aronofsky's film Requiem for a Dream as being among Kon's list of films he viewed for 2010. In addition, Kon blogged about his meeting with Aronofsky in 2001.

Other media 

Seven Seas Entertainment has obtained the English-language publication rights for the original 1991 Perfect Blue story Perfect Blue: Complete Metamorphosis and the 2002 anthology sequel Perfect Blue: Awaken from a Dream in April 2017. They released them in February and April 2018, respectively.

Notes

References 

 Book references

External links 

 
 Official Geneon Entertainment website 
 Official Madhouse Animation website 
  
 
 
 
 

1990s Japanese-language films
1990s psychological thriller films
1997 anime films
1997 directorial debut films
1997 films
Animated thriller films
Anime films based on novels
Films about actors
Films about schizophrenia
Films about singers
Films about stalking
Films based on Japanese novels
Films directed by Satoshi Kon
Japanese adult animated films
Japanese idols in anime and manga
Japanese nonlinear narrative films
Japanese serial killer films
Madhouse (company)
Magic realism films
Psychological thriller anime and manga